Coventry Village is a commercial business district in Cleveland Heights, Ohio, situated on Coventry Road between Mayfield Road (U.S. Route 322) and Euclid Heights Boulevard.  Coventry is associated with Northeast Ohio's artistic, musical, bohemian, hippie and emerging hipster communities and is the center of Cleveland's creative class, inviting comparisons to the Haight-Ashbury district in San Francisco and Greenwich Village in New York City, although on a smaller scale.

History

The road bisecting what is now Coventry Village appears in the map of Harris H. Blackmore of 1852 as an unidentified north–south route connecting the North Union Shaker Settlement, then near its peak of about 300 settlers, to what is now Mayfield Road.  It was the eastern terminus of Cedar Road in the rural area then known as East Cleveland Township, separating it from Warrensville Township to the east.  The road passed through farmland acquired by Worthy S. Streator located between Mayfield Road and Cedar Road who chose aptly to assuage his wife's growing misgivings over haunted farmland by turning the wartime burial gulley into a commercial area funded by the Shakers. By 1890 it was known as the North-South County Road, or Streator Road.  That year, Patrick Calhoun, a lawyer visiting town on railroad business, spied the James A. Garfield Memorial in Lake View Cemetery from a bluff on Streator's farm. He immediately offered to purchase Streator's acreage surrounding Streator Road for $30,000, closing the purchase in 1891.  Calhoun intended to develop acreage as part of an upscale planned community that he named "Euclid Heights". Calhoun intended Euclid Heights to be a New England-style upper-income community of Protestants of Anglo-Saxon heritage. By 1892 the road was identified as Coventry Road in George F. Cram & Company's atlas of that year.  The part of East Cleveland Township now known as Cleveland Heights became a hamlet in 1901, and then a village in 1903.

As demand for large houses declined in the coming decades, and Calhoun's realty company became insolvent in the 1910s, unbuilt lots in the portion of Euclid Heights near Coventry Road were sold at foreclosure sales. Developers built apartment buildings on these empty lots.

The Euclid Heights and Mayfield streetcar routes met at the Coventry–Mayfield intersection, making the area a convenient commuter transfer point after 1907. Most of the buildings on Coventry were constructed between 1913 and 1933, with the greatest growth occurring between 1921 and 1925, when 18 commercial buildings were erected. Buildings erected for retail walk-in traffic typically included second story apartments, to maximize the benefits of urbanization and rapid population growth. The new Coventry business district served streetcar passengers and the increasing populations of the Euclid Heights and Mayfield Heights developments. Before then, the nearest commercial center was at Doan's Corners.

By the early 1920s, the newly built apartment district attracted a large, thriving Jewish community. This influence was reflected in the commercial district by, among other things, a kosher poultry slaughterhouse. In 1921, Cleveland Heights attained cityhood.

The motion picture Les Amants ("The Lovers") was first shown locally in 1959 at the Heights Art Theatre, then located at the intersection of Coventry Road and Euclid Heights Boulevard. Theater manager Nico Jacobellis was arrested and convicted on obscenity charges for showing the film. By its decision in Jacobellis v. Ohio, 378 U.S. 184 (1964), the U.S. Supreme Court overturned the conviction.  Agreeing that Jacobellis' criminal conviction was improper and that the film was not obscene, Justice Potter Stewart famously described his perspective on obscene material: "I know it when I see it..." The U.S. Supreme Court diminished the importance of Jacobellis by decisions it entered years later, yet "I know it when I see it" remains one of the best-remembered quotations in its history. 

In the second half of the 1960s, Coventry became the gathering place for Cleveland's counterculture, owing partly to the popularity of the C-Saw Café with bikers, and to the area's proximity to John Carroll University and the predecessor schools to Case Western Reserve University and Cleveland State University.  As one writer explains, this transition was sudden:

"In addition to the problems facing aging communities everywhere...the Jewish community of Cleveland Heights faced two additional problems at the end of the 1960s: the dramatic takeover of a small area of the city by hippies and motorcyclists, and the quickening pace of integration....The counterculture flower children with long hair, health food, music, and, most significantly, drugs virtually took over [Coventry Village] during the second half of the 1960s. Hippies overflowed the Gothic apartments, cardboard "Store for Rent" signs seemed to be everywhere, and motorcycle groups (if not gangs) dotted the corners in the evening....[P]olice had begun to probe recurrent reports of drug use (marijuana and LSD) among Cleveland Heights High School students." (citation and footnote forthcoming)

Record Revolution, which opened in 1968 and continues to operate, became a destination for rock stars passing through Cleveland, and most of its famous customers autographed the store walls. Among them were members of Led Zeppelin, Genesis, Bad Company, The Who, Mott the Hoople, Bruce Springsteen, Southside Johnny, Hall & Oates, Brian Eno, the Psychedelic Furs, Deborah Harry of Blondie, and the Pixies. The staff hosted in-store album signings with then-breaking artists Lou Reed, Patti Smith, and Elvis Costello. In his book The Catalog of Cool (1982), rock critic Gene Sculatti called Record Revolution “the coolest place to buy records” in Ohio. In the 1970s, Record Revolution was one of the three "breakout" record stores in Greater Cleveland that affected radio play at the influential rock station WMMS. When WMMS management added to its playlist a new album or a new artist, particularly one on the cutting edge or left of center, an early indicator of success was sales at Record Revolution. To stay competitive, Record Revolution expanded its business model to retailing of clothing and paraphernalia euphemistically called "smoking accessories".

Over the years, the sense of a Jewish neighborhood on Coventry transitioned into a more eclectic marketplace.  Pioneering entrepreneurs included Kaufman's, Frankel's Jewelry, Irv's Deli, Heights Art Theatre, Allen Lock & Key, A-Appliance, Dobama Theatre, Arabica coffeehouse, Renaissance Parlour, Generation Gap, and High Tide Rock Bottom.

Current attractions

Heights Hardware is Coventry Village's oldest business (since 1911). Coventry also boasts a thriving music scene, including rock club the Grog Shop and its liquor lounge counterpart, the B-Side. Area mainstay Record Revolution sells classic vinyl, and The Exchange (formerly the Record Exchange). There are two book stores: Attenson's Antiques/Vintage & Books and Mac's Backs. Restaurants include The Inn on Coventry, Hunan Coventry, Tommy's (who only have drip coffee - there is no espresso machine on site), Grums Sub Shop, High Thai'd, Pacific East, Pho and Rice, Tree Country Bistro, BD's Mongolian Barbecue, Bodega, Cilantro Taqueria, Seafoof Shake, Guy's Pizza, and Dave's Cosmic Subs. Drink options are The Whiskey Bar and a local coffee house, Phoenix Coffee. Other attractions are the clothing store/head shop Sunshine, the sneaker store and clothing boutique The Blueprint, Passport to Peru, the vintage clothing store Avalon Exchange, the hookah bar City and East, a comedy club, Big Dog Theater, and an American Apparel retail outlet. In recent years more local businesses have popped up on the street, most are trendy boutiques.

Notes

References
Encyclopedia of Cleveland History, Coventry Village Business District, 
Encyclopedia of Cleveland History, Jacobellis v. Ohio, 
Barrow, William C., The Euclid Heights Allotment:  A Palimpsest of the Nineteenth Century Search for Real Estate Value in Cleveland's East End, Chapter VII, Cleveland State University (Master's thesis)(1997),

External links

Official site
Description from ClevelandHeights.com

Neighborhoods in Ohio
Cleveland Heights, Ohio
Geography of Cuyahoga County, Ohio
Tourist attractions in Cuyahoga County, Ohio
Bookstore neighborhoods